Rhytisma is a genus of soft corals in the family Alcyoniidae.

Species
The World Register of Marine Species includes the following species in the genus :

 Rhytisma fulvum (Forskål, 1775)
 Rhytisma fuscum (Thomson & Henderson, 1906)
 Rhytisma monticulum (Verseveldt, 1982)
 Rhytisma rubiginosum (Verseveldt, 1969)

References

Alcyoniidae
Octocorallia genera